Dan Rogers is a Canadian politician. He was the mayor of Prince George, British Columbia. He previously served as a city councillor for Prince George City Council until his resignation to run for the mayoral position.

References
 Prince George biography

External links
 

British Columbia Institute of Technology alumni
Living people
Year of birth missing (living people)
Mayors of Prince George, British Columbia